The British Compressed Gases Association is the UK's trade association for companies in the industrial, medical and food gases industry. BCGA was established in August 1971, succeeding the British Acetylene Association, which was formed in 1901.

Function
The BCGA represents companies that make, supply or distribute industrial, medical and food gases in the UK, who sell related equipment, install distribution systems and who are providers of specialist health, safety, quality, inspection and training services.  It represents the interests of 100+ member companies.  It is primarily a safety and technical Trade Association, in support of which it provides many well-regarded best practice documents and advice on its website.

The gases industry uses many standards and its members are represented at safety standards organisations such as BSI, the European Committee for Standardization (CEN) and the International Organization for Standardization (ISO).

Structure
The head Offices is based in Derby.

Its members include all the major gas suppliers in the UK and many SME's.

References

External links
Official Website
LPG Gas Cylinder

Organisations based in Derby
Chemical companies of the United Kingdom
Industrial gases
Organizations established in 1971
1971 establishments in the United Kingdom
Trade associations based in the United Kingdom